Marshall Ashby Purse (1867–1938) was a 19th- and 20th-century American physician. He was eminent in Atlanta, Georgia.

Life and career
Purse was born in 1867 in Savannah, Georgia, to Daniel Gugel Purse Sr. and Laura Ashby, one of their seven children.

He graduated from Emory University in Atlanta in 1890 and from Columbia College in New York in 1892.

He married Josephine Earnest.

In 1896, he succeeded Dr. Harris as professor of chemistry at Southern Medical College in Atlanta.

Death
Purse died in 1938, aged 70 or 71. He is interred in Christ Church Episcopal Cemetery, St. Simons, Georgia.

References

1867 births
1938 deaths
People from Savannah, Georgia
People from Atlanta
Physicians from Georgia (U.S. state)
19th-century American physicians
20th-century American physicians
Columbia College (New York) alumni
Emory University School of Medicine faculty